This is a list of summits and ridge highpoints in Rabun County, Georgia with elevations greater than .

Note: ^Marked elevations have been estimated from topographic maps.

^Elevations estimated from topographic maps.

See also
List of mountains in Georgia (U.S. state)

References

Sources
Rabun County elevations from Topozone.com
Georgia's Named Summits
100 highest peaks in Georgia
Georgia peaks over 4,000 feet

Georgia, Rabun County
Georgia, Rabun County